This is a list of conflicts in Ireland, including wars, armed rebellions, battles and skirmishes. Irish Warriors participated in many wars in Europe and “England” as well and are not completely recognized on this page.

List of wars and rebellions in Ireland

List of battles in Ireland

Prehistoric era

5th century
459 – Ath Dara
464 – First Battle of Dumha Aichir 
468 – Bri Ele 
470 – Second Battle of Dumha Aichir 
476 – First Battle of Granard 
478 – Ocha 
480 – Second Battle of Granard 
483 – Battle of Ochae 
489 – Tailtin 
491 – Cell Losnaid 
492 – Sleamhain, in Meath 
493 – Battle for the Body of St. Patrick 
494 – Ceann Ailbhe 
496 – Druim Lochmaighe 
497 – Inde Mor, in Crioch Ua nGabhla 
499 – Seaghais

6th century
500 – Lochmagh 
501 – Freamhain, in Meath 
506 – Luachair 
507 – Druim Deargaighe 
528 – Luachair 
531 – Claenloch 
537 – Sligeach 
544 – Cuil Conaire 
546 – Cuilne 
556 – Cuil Uinnsenn 
561 – Cul Dremne 
563 – Moin Dairi Lothar 
571 – Battle of Tola 
572 – Battle of Doete 
579 – Druim Mic Earca 
585 – Kalketh 
590 – Eadan Mor 
594 – Dun Bolg 
597 – Battle of Sleamhain 
598 – Eachros

7th century
600 – Loch Semhedidhe 
601 – Battle of Slaibhre 
622 – Carn Fearadhaigh 
622 – Lethed Midinn 
624 – Ard Corainn 
626 – Leathairbhe 
628 – Ath Goan 
634 – Magh Rath 
637 – Battle of Moira
645 – Carn Conaill 
648 – Cuil Corra 
656 – Fleasach 
660 – Ogamhain 
666 – Battle of Aine 
681 – Bla Sléibe  
685 – Cenn Conn 
686 – Leach Phich 
688 – Imlech 
696 – Tulach Garraisg

8th century
701 – Corann 
702 – Claen Ath 
713 – Cam Feradaig 
718 – Battle of Almhain 
719 – Delgean 
721 – Druim Fornocht 
724 – Cenn Deilgden 
727 – Magh Itha 
730 – Bealach Ele 
732 – Fochart 
733 – Battle of Ath Seanaith 
738 – Ceanannus 
744 – Ard Cianachta 
749 – Ard Naescan 
751 – Bealach Cro 
759 – Dun Bile 
762 – Caill Tuidbig 
769 – Bolg Boinne 
781 – Ath Liacc Finn 
787 – Ard Mic Rime

9th century
800 – Ardrahan 
820 – Carn Conain 
845 – Dunamase 
848 – Battle of Skryne 
851 – Battle of Dundalk 
877 – Battle of Strangford Lough

10th century
908 – Battle of Bellaghmoon
917 – Battle of Confey
919 – Battle of Islandbridge
967/8 – Battle of Sulcoit
967/8 – Burning of Luimnech
977/8 – Battle of Cathair Cuan
978 – Battle of Belach Lechta
980 – Battle of Tara
994 – Sack of Domhnach Padraig 
994 – Sack of Aenach Thete 
999 – Battle of Glenmama

11th century
1014 – Battle of Clontarf
1086 – Breach of Crinach 
1087 – Conachail, in Corann
1087 – Rath Edair 
1088 – Corcach 
1090 – Magh Lena, in Meath 
1094 – Bealach Gort an Iubhair 
1094 – Fidhnacha 
1095 – Ard Achad 
1098 – Fearsat-Suilighe 
1099 – Craebh Tulla

12th century
1101 – Battle of Grianan 
1103 – Battle of Magh Cobha
1132 – Siege of Dún Béal Gallimhe
1149 – Siege of Dún Béal Gallimhe
1151 – Battle of Móin Mhór
1169/05 – Beginning of the Norman invasion of Ireland
1169/05 – Battle of Duncormac, County Wexford – Norman victory over a combined Irish-Norse force
1169/05 – Siege of Wexford – Norman victory over a combined Irish-Norse force
1169/05 – Battle of Gowran – Norman defeat
1170/05 – Battle of Dundonnell (aka Battle of Baginbun), County Wexford – Norman victory over a combined Irish-Norse force
1170/08 – Battle of Waterford – Norman victory over a combined Irish-Norse force
1170/09 – Sack of Dublin – Norman victory over a combined Irish-Norse force
1171/08 – Siege of Dublin – Norman victory
1171 – Battle of Carrick – Norman defeat
1173 – Battle of Kilkenny – Norman defeat
1174 – Battle of Thurles – Norman defeat
1175 – Battle of Meath – Norman victory
1175 – Battle of Athlone – Norman victory
1175 – Battle of Drogheda – Norman victory
1176 – Battle of Meath – Norman defeat
1176 – Battle of Armagh – Norman defeat
1192 – Aughera – Norman defeat

13th century
1224 – Sack of Ard Abla 
1225 – Sack of Loch Nen 
1225 – Sack of Ardrahan 
1230 – Siege of Dún Béal Gallimhe
1230 – Findcairn 
1232 – Siege of Dún Béal Gallimhe
1234 – Battle of the Curragh
1235 – Siege of Dún Béal Gallimhe
1247 – Battle of Ballyshannon 
1247 – Siege of Dún Béal Gallimhe
1249 – First Battle of Athenry
1256 – Battle of Magh Slecht
1257 – Battle of Creadran Cille
1257 – Sack of Sligo 
1260 – Battle of Druim Dearg
1261 – Battle of Callann
1270 – Battle of Áth-an-Chip

14th century

Bruce Campaign

1315 – Battle of Carrickfergus 
1315 – Battle of Moiry Pass (June) 
1315 – First battle of Dundalk (June) 
1315 – Battle of Connor (September)
1315 – Second battle of Dundalk (November) 
1315 – Battle of Kells (December)
1316 – Battle of Skerries (January)
1316 – Second Battle of Athenry (August)
1317 – Battle of Lough Raska (August)
1318 – Battle of Dysert O'Dea (May)
1318 – Battle of Faughart (October)

1328 – Battle of Thomond
1329 – Braganstown massacre 
1329 – Battle of Ardnocher
1330 – Battle of Fiodh-an-Átha
1333–1338 – Burke Civil War
1336 – Castlemore-Costello besieged and demolished by the King of Connacht 
1340 – Battle of the O Cellaig's 
1341 – Battle of the Clan Maurice 
1342 – Battle of Beal-atha-Slisen – King of Connacht defeats the King of Moylurg 
1343 – Battle of Hy-Many – MacFeorais and Clanricarde soundly defeat a small force from the Uí Maine. Achadhmona; battle between the O'Donnells, in Tirhugh
1345 – Battle of Lough Neagh – naval battle between Hugh O'Neill and the Clann Hugh Buidhe 
1346 – Calry-Lough-Gill – O Rourke soundly defeated by the O Connors. Brian Mag Mathgamna defeats and kills 300 English somewhere in Thomond 
1348 – Ballymote besieged and burned by MacDermot, O Connor defeated 
1349 – O Melaghlin of Meath defeated in battle by the English 
1355 – The English of West Connaught defeated Mac William Burke, and killed many of his people Clanricarde defeats the Mayo Bourkes and the Siol Anmchadha 
1356 – Baile-Locha-Deacair 
1358 – Hugh O Neill defeats the Fer Managh and Orial. O More defeats the English of Dublin in battle 
1359 – Ballyshannon 
1366 – Srath-Fear-Luirg 
1368 – Oriel 
1369 – Blencupa 
1369 – Lough Erne – English of Munster and Desmond soundly defeated by O Brian, possibly at Limerick 
1373 – Annaly 
1374 – Niall O Neill defeats the English 
1375 – Downpatrick – Niall O Neill defeats the English 
1377 – Clann-Cuilein – Clanricarde and his allies defeated 
1377 – Roscommon – Ruaidri O Conchobhair defeats the Mayo Burkes and the Uí Maine 
1379 – Dreach – O Neill Mor defeats Maguire 
1380 – Atha-leathann – Clanricarde defeated by Bourke of Mayo 
1381 – Athlone 
1383 – Trian Chongail – Hugh O Neill and Robin Savage kill each other in a cavalry charge 
1384 – Carrickfergus "burned by Niall O'Neill, who thereupon acquired great power over the English" 
1385 – Battle of Tochar Cruachain-Bri-Ele – O Conchobhair, King of Uí Falighe, soundly defeats the English of Meath
1389 – Caislen an Uabhair 
1391 – Bealach-an-Chrionaigh 
1392 – Ceann-Maghair 
1394 – Battle of Ros-Mhic-Thriúin
1395 – Cruachain – the King of Uí Failghe defeats an English expedition. O Donnell defeats and captures the sons of Henry O Neill 
1396 – Creag – O Conchobhair Roe defeats O Conchobhair Donn. O Tuathail of Lenister inflicts a severe defeat on the Anglo-Irish 
1396 – Sligo – O Donnell and O Connor besiege and burn the town 
1397 – Machaire Chonnacht 
1397 – Bun-Brenoige 
1398 – Eachdruim Mac n-Aodha – the O Tooles and O Byrnes defeat the Anglo-Irish, killing the Earl of March 
1398 – Magh-Tuiredh – O Conchobair Roe and allies defeated by McDonagh 
1399 – Battle of Tragh-Bhaile – the Anglo-Irish defeat the sons of Henry O Neill

15th century
1400 – Dunamon. 
1406 – Battle of Cluain Immorrais
1444 – Duibhthrian; Sligo burned by the O Donnells, Maguires and O Connors. 
1446 – Cuil Ua bh-Fionntain 
1449 – Muintir-Maelmora 
1452 – Cloch-an-bhodaigh; Coirrshliabh na Seaghsa 
1453 – Ardglass (naval battle) 
1454 – Inis 
1455 – Athlone: The castle of Athlone was taken from the English, having been betrayed by a woman who was in it.
1456 – Cuil Mic an Treoin (Friday 18 May) 
1457 – Druim da Ethiar  
1460 – Corca Bhaiscinn (naval battle) 
1461 – Ceann Maghair 
1462 – Waterford taken by the Butlers in a war with the FitzGeralds. 
1462 – Lancastrian Butlers defeated by Yorkist FitzGeralds at Battle of Piltown in Wars of the Roses.
1464 – Sliabh Lugha 
1465 – Carn Fraoich 
1466 – Offaly; Anglo-Irish army defeated by O Connor 
1467 – CrosMoighe-Croin 
1468 – Beann-uamha; Scormor, in Clann Chathail mic Murray 
1469 – Baile-an-Duibh; The Defeat of Glanog 
1473 – Doire-Bhaile-na-Cairrge 
1475 – Baile-Locha-Luatha 
1476 – Beal Feirste (Belfast)
1478 – Sligo, and the siege of Carrig Lough Ce 
1482 – Ath-na-gCeannaigheadh 
1483 – Traghbhaile of Dundalk 
1484 – Moin-Ladhraighe 
1486 – Tirawley 
1488 – two sieges of Carraig Lough Ce 
1489 – Belfast castle demolished by O Donnell; Ballytober Bride sacked by O Connor Roe 
1490 – Maigh Croghan 
1493 – Glasdromainn; Beanna Boirche; 
1494 – O Donnell besieges Sligo for several months in the summer, but is unsuccessful 
1495 – O Donnell besieges Sligo again; battle of Beal an Droichit; siege of Ballyshannon; battle of Termon-Daveog; Siege of Waterford 
1497 – Bealach-Buidhe; Beal Ath Daire. 
1498 – Cros-Caibhdeanaigh. Dungannon. 
1499 – Tulsk. First recorded death in Ireland from a bullet.

16th century
1504 – Battle of Knockdoe – Fitzgeralds of Kildare defeat the Clanricarde Burkes
1522 – Battle of Knockavoe – Clash between O'Donnells and O'Neills
1534 – Battle of Salcock Wood- A force from Dublin is defeated by a coalition of the O'Tooles and Fitzgerald supporters.
1534 – Siege of Dublin Castle by 'Silken' Thomas Fitzgerald in Kildare
1535 – Siege of Maynooth Castle, the chief residence of Fitzgerald, by English forces
1539 – Battle of Bellahoe Ford – A force led by Leonard Grey routs an O'Donnell/O'Neill force
1559 – Battle of Spancel Hill, a conflict over the O'Brien succession
1565 – Battle of Glentasie – Shane O'Neill defeats the MacDonnells of Clan Iain Mor
1565 – Battle of Affane – Fitzgeralds of Desmond defeated by Butlers of Ormond
1567 – Battle of Farsetmore – Shane O'Neill defeated by O'Donnell clan
1570 – Battle of Shrule
1575 – Rathlin Island Massacre 
1583 – Battle of Aura  – McQuillans, MacDonnells and O'Neills fight for controll of Dunluce Castle
1586 – Battle of Ardnaree – Mercenary Scots entering Connacht are surprised and destroyed by Bingham's army
1590 – Battle of Doire Leathan – part of the O'Donnell Succession dispute

Mac an Iarla War

c. 1570–1583, between the sons of Richard Burke, 2nd Earl of Clanricarde

Desmond Rebellions

First Desmond Rebellion (1569–1573)
1569 – Siege of Kilkenny 
1569 – First Battle of Killamock 
1571 – Second Battle of Kilmallock

Second Desmond Rebellion (1579–1583)
1579 – Aenachbeg 
1579 – Sack of Youghal 
1579 – Sack of Kinsale 
1580 – Battle of Glenmalure
1580 – Siege of Carrigafoyle Castle
1580 – Siege of Smerwick
1582 – Allhallowtide

Spanish Armada

1588 – Crown mobilisation to capture survivors

Nine Years' War

1593 – Battle of Belleek 
1594 – Siege of Enniskillen
1594 – Battle of the Ford of the Biscuits
1595 – Battle of Clontibret
1596 – Third Sack of Athenry
1596 – Siege of Galway, Sack of Bohermore
1597 – Battle of Casan-na-gCuradh
1597 – Battle of Carrickfergus
1598 – Battle of the Yellow Ford
1599 – Siege of Cahir Castle
1599 – Battle of Deputy's Pass
1599 – Battle of Curlew Pass
1600 – Battle of Moyry Pass
1600 – Battle of Lifford 
1601 – Battle of Castlehaven
1601 – Siege of Donegal
1601 – Battle of Kinsale
1602 – Siege of Dunboy
1602 – Burning of Dungannon

17th century

O'Doherty's Rebellion

1608- Burning of Derry
1608- Battle of Kilmacrennan: Ends Cahir O'Doherty's brief rebellion.
1608- Siege of Tory Island

Irish Confederate Wars

1641 – Portadown Massacre 
1641 – Siege of Drogheda 
1641 – Battle of Julianstown
1642 – Battle of Swords
1642 – Battle of Liscarroll
1642 – Battle of Kilrush
1642 – Battle of Glenmaquin
1642 – Sack of the Claddagh
1642 – Siege of Limerick 1642
1643 – Battle of New Ross (1643)
1643 – Battle of Cloughleagh
1643 – Battle of Clones 
1643 – Battle of Portlester
1643 – Siege of Forthill
1645 – Siege of Duncannon
1646 – Battle of Benburb
1646 – Siege of Bunratty
1647 – Battle of Dungans Hill
1647 – Sack of Cashel
1647 – Battle of Knocknanauss
1649 - Siege of Dublin
1649 – Battle of Rathmines
1649 – Siege of Drogheda
1649 – Sack of Wexford
1649 – Siege of Waterford
1649 – Battle of Arklow/Glascarrick
1649 – Battle of Lisnagarvey
1649 – Siege of Derry (1649)
1650 – Siege of Kilkenny
1650 – Siege of Clonmel
1650 – Battle of Tecroghan
1650 – Battle of Scarrifholis
1650 – Siege of Charlemont
1650 – Battle of Macroom
1650 – Battle of Meelick Island
1651 – Siege of Limerick (1650–1651)
1651 – Battle of Knocknaclashy
1652 – Siege of Galway

Williamite War

1689 – Break of Dromore
1689 – Siege of Derry
1689 – Battle of Bantry Bay
1689 – Battle of Newtownbutler 
1689 – Siege of Carrickfergus
1689 – Raid on Newry
1690 – Battle of Cavan
1690 – Capture of Sligo 
1690 – Battle of the Boyne
1690 – Capture of Waterford 
1690 – Siege of Limerick (1690)
1690 – Siege of Cork
1690 – Siege of Kinsale (1690)
1691 – Siege of Athlone
1691 – Capture of Athenry 
1691 – Battle of Aughrim
1691 – Siege of Galway
1691 – Siege of Limerick (1691)

18th century
1760 – Battle of Carrickfergus – Carrickfergus seized by the French for five days.
1795 – Battle of the Diamond – a sectarian faction fight in County Armagh, that led to the founding of the Orange Order

United Irishmen Rebellion

24 May – Ballymore-Eustace, Naas, Prosperous, Kilcullen
25 May – Carlow
26 May – Tara Hill
27 May – Oulart Hill
28 May – Enniscorthy
30 May – Three Rocks
1 June – Bunclody
4 June – Tuberneering
5 June – New Ross
7 June – Antrim
9 June – Saintfield
9 June – Arklow
13 June – Ballinahinch
19 June – Ovidstown
20 June – Foulksmills
21 June – Vinegar Hill
30 June – Ballyellis
27 August – Castlebar
5 September – Collooney
7 September – Ballinamuck

Several fragments of the rebel armies of the Summer of 1798 survived to fight on both in the hope of the rebellion breaking out again and of French aid. The main guerrilla groupings were:
June – November 1798 – Joseph Holt
23 July 1803 – Robert Emmet
1798 -1803 – Michael Dwyer
1798 – 1804 – James Corcoran

19th century
1803 – Irish rebellion of 1803: failed republican uprising led by Robert Emmet.
1831–1836 – Tithe War: a period of rural insurgency over the payment of tithes to the Church of Ireland by non-members.
1848 – Young Ireland rebellion: failed Irish nationalist uprising by the Young Ireland group.
1867 – Fenian Rising: an abortive attempt at a nationwide rebellion by the Irish Republican Brotherhood.

20th century

Irish revolutionary years

Only the major engagements of this period are listed below.

1916 – Easter Rising

Irish War of Independence

1919 January 19  – Soloheadbeg Ambush
1920 November 2 – Battle of Ballinalee
1920 November 28 – Kilmichael Ambush
1921 February 1 – Clonfin Ambush
1921 February 3 - Dromkeen ambush
1921 February 20 - Clonmult ambush
1921 February 25 – Coolavokig Ambush
1921 March 11 - Selton Hill ambush
1921 March 19 – Crossbarry Ambush
1921 March 21 - Headford Ambush
1921 March 23 - Scramoge ambush
1921 May 19 - Kilmeena ambush
1921 May 25 - Burning of the Custom House
1921 June 2 - Carrowkennedy ambush

Irish Civil War

1922 – Battle of Dublin
1922 – Irish Free State offensive
1922 – Battle of Kilmallock

IRA Northern Campaigns
1942–1944 – First guerrilla campaign by the Irish Republican Army (1922–1969)
1956–1962 – Second guerrilla campaign by the Irish Republican Army (1922–1969)

The Troubles

1969 – Battle of the Bogside
1970 – Falls Curfew
1971 - Operation Demetrius
1972 - Bloody Sunday
1972 - Battle at Springmartin
1972 - Battle of Lenadoon
1972 - Operation Motorman
1972 - Springhill Massacre
1972 - Bloody Friday
1974 - Attack on UDR Clogher barracks
1975 - Drummuckavall ambush
1978 - Jonesboro Army Gazelle downing
1979 - Warrenpoint ambush
1984 - Kesh ambush
1985 - Strabane ambush
1985 - Newry mortar attack
1987 - Loughgall ambush
1988 - Ballygawley bus bombing
1989 - Attack on Derryard checkpoint
1990 - Derrygorry Army Gazelle downing
1990 - Operation Conservation
1991 - Mullacreevie ambush
1991 - Glenanne barracks bombing
1991 - Coagh ambush
1991 - Cappagh killings
1992 - Clonoe ambush
1992 - Attack on Cloghoge checkpoint
1992 - Coalisland riots
1992 - South Armagh sniper campaign
1993 - Battle of Newry Road
1994 - Crossmaglen Army Lynx downing
1994 - 1994 Shankill Road killings
1997 - July riots

Dissident Irish Republican Campaign 

 1999- Stamullen raid

See also

List of Irish rebellions
Military history of Ireland
Irish military diaspora

References

Secondary references

External links
CELT: Corpus of Electronic Texts at University College Cork includes the Annals of Ulster, Tigernach, the Four Masters and Innisfallen, the Chronicon Scotorum, the Lebor Bretnach (which includes the Duan Albanach), Genealogies, and various Saints' Lives. Most are translated into English, or translations are in progress.

 
Irish
Battles
Conflicts